Reinhard Jirgl (born 16 January 1953 in East-Berlin) is a German writer.

Biography
Jirgl was born in Berlin-Friedrichshain. He became a skilled worker for electromechanics. Then he completed a degree in electronics at Humboldt University, Berlin. He made first attempts at prose during his studies in the early 1970s. From 1975 he worked as an engineer at the Academy of Sciences. He gave up his profession in 1978 to devote more time to writing. He worked as a lighting and service technician at the Volksbühne in Berlin. After submitting his first novel Mutter Vater Roman to a Berlin publishing house in 1985, he was accused of a "non-Marxist conception of history". The publication of the novel was refused. Until 1989, none of his manuscripts were published. Since 2009 he has been a member of the German Academy for Language and Literature. and he is member of the PEN Centre Germany.

In 2010 he was awarded the Georg Büchner Prize by the German Academy for Language and Literature. His 2013 novel Nichts von euch auf Erden was shortlisted for the German Book Prize.

At the beginning of 2017, Jirgl withdrew completely from the public. He lives in Berlin.

Awards

 1991: Anna Seghers-Preis
 1993: Alfred-Döblin-Preis
 1994: Marburg Literatur Prize
 1998: 
 1999: Joseph-Breitbach-Preis
 2003: Kranichsteiner Literaturpreis, 
 2003: Rheingau Literatur Preis
 2004: Eugen Viehof-Ehrengabe der Deutschen Schillerstiftung von 1859,
 2004: Dedalus-Preis für Neue Literatur
 2006: Literaturpreis der Stadt Bremen
 2007/08: Stadtschreiber von Bergen
 2009: Lion-Feuchtwanger-Preis
 2009: Grimmelshausen-Preis for Die Stille
 2010: Georg-Büchner-Preis
 2011: Sudetendeutscher Kulturpreis

Scholarships
 1994: Scholarship in Künstlerdorf Schöppingen
 1995: Scholarship of the Berliner Kultursenat
 1996: Alfred-Döblin-Stipendium
 1997: Scholarship in Künstlerhof Schreyahn
 1998: Scholarship of the Heinrich-Heine-Haus Lüneburg
 2002: Scholarship of the Deutscher Literaturfond
 2007: Scholarship in Künstlerhaus Edenkoben

Works 
 Mutter Vater Roman. Aufbau, Berlin/Weimar 1990. .
 Uberich. Protokollkomödie in den Tod. Jassmann, Frankfurt am Main 1990, .
 Im offenen Meer. [Schichtungsroman]. Luchterhand, Hamburg/Zürich 1991, .
 together with Andrzej Madela: Zeichenwende. Kultur im Schatten posttotalitärer Mentalität. Bublies, Koblenz 1993, .
 Das obszöne Gebet. Totenbuch. Jassmann, Frankfurt am Main 1993, .
 Abschied von den Feinden. novel. Hanser, Munich/Vienna 1995, .
 Hundsnächte. novel. Hanser, Munich/Vienna 1997, .
 Die atlantische Mauer. novel. Hanser, Munich/Vienna 2000, .
 Genealogie des Tötens. Trilogie. Hanser, Munich 2002, .
 Gewitterlicht. stories, with the Essay Das poetische Vermögen des alphanumerischen Codes in der Prosa. In: Edition Einst und Jetzt Band 3. revonnah, Hannover 2002, .
 Die Unvollendeten. novel. Hanser, Munich/Vienna 2003, .
 Abtrünnig. Roman aus der nervösen Zeit. Hanser, Munich 2005, . (Paperback: dtv 13639, Munich/Vienna 2008 .)
 Land und Beute. Aufsätze aus den Jahren 1996 bis 2006. Edition Akzente, Hanser, Munich 2008, .
 Die Stille. Roman. Hanser, Munich 2009, .
 Nichts von euch auf Erden. Hanser, Munich 2013, .
 Oben das Feuer, unten der Berg. Hanser, Munich 2016, .

References

1953 births
Living people
Members of the Academy of Arts, Berlin
20th-century German novelists
21st-century German novelists
21st-century German male writers
German essayists
Georg Büchner Prize winners
Writers from Berlin
German male essayists
German male novelists
20th-century essayists
21st-century essayists
20th-century German male writers